The INAS Global Games is a quadrennial global, international multi-sport event organised by the International Sports Federation for Persons with Intellectual Disability (INAS). First organised in 2004, it is intended for elite competition in disability sports for athletes with intellectual disability and, since 2017, autism and down syndrome. It is the largest sporting event of its type. Athletes must have received classification from INAS to compete.

History
A precursor event was the World Games for Athletes with an Intellectual Disability held in 1989. The competition was discontinued following the integration of athletes with intellectual disabilities into the Paralympics programme in 1996, though renewed exclusion following disability fabrication at the 2000 Summer Paralympics led to the relaunch as the INAS Global Games. The first three INAS Global Games were hosted in Europe. The fourth edition in 2015 expanded to South America, though INAS were forced to take over organisational duties due to the collapse of the local organising committee. Australia won the hosting rights for the 2019 event, having led the medal rankings of the previous three. Initially the competition was seen as a specialist event by other sports governing bodies, but the INAS athletics, swimming and table tennis competitions are now recognised and sanctioned by the main global bodies for those disability sports.

The games is separate from the INAS World Championships, which are a series of sport-specific championships.

Editions

Number of athletes at the 2019 Global Games (highest to lowest)

All-time medal table (2004 to 2019)

Virtus Americas Regional Games

Virtus Oceania Asia Games

Sports

See also
Special Olympics
IWAS World Games
Deaflympics
Invictus Games

Other INAS sporting championships
INAS World Athletics Championships
INAS World Swimming Championships

References

 
Disabled multi-sport events
Recurring sporting events established in 2004